Assassin's Creed Origins is a 2017 action role-playing video game developed by Ubisoft Montreal and published by Ubisoft. It is the tenth major installment in the Assassin's Creed series, following 2015's Assassin's Creed Syndicate. Principally set in Egypt, near the end of the Ptolemaic period from 49 to 43 BC, the story follows a Medjay named Bayek of Siwa and his wife Aya as they seek revenge for the murder of their son, and explores the origins of the millennia-long conflict between the Hidden Ones—forerunners to the Assassin Brotherhood, and the Order of the Ancients—forerunners to the Templar Order. The framing story, set in the 21st century, follows a new character, Layla Hassan, who relives Bayek and Aya's memories using a modified Animus device.

The game's development began following the release of Assassin's Creed IV: Black Flag in 2013. Ubisoft Montreal led its four-year development with help from a team of nearly 700 people from other Ubisoft studios around the world. The team consulted Egyptologists and historians extensively to ensure the setting was authentically represented in the game. In response to the common criticism that the gameplay of the series was getting stale and overly familiar, Ubisoft decided to reinvent the Assassin's Creed formula with Origins. Whereas previous entries were mainly stealth-action games, Origins introduces many elements found in role-playing games and an overhauled "hitbox-based" combat system. While Assassin's Creed had been an annual franchise since Assassin's Creed II (2009), an extra year of development time allowed the team to polish the game further. This was largely a response to the tepid sales of Syndicate, and the troubled launch of Assassin's Creed Unity, which was plagued with technical issues when it was released in 2014.

Announced at E3 2017, Origins was released on October 27, 2017, for PlayStation 4, Windows, and Xbox One, and for Stadia on December 15, 2020. It received positive reviews from critics, with many calling it an improvement over previous entries and praising the story, characters, voice acting, reworked gameplay systems, world design, historical accuracy, and the visuals. However, the game also drew criticism for its pacing, quest design, and technical issues. The game has sold over ten million units worldwide and was nominated for several end-of-year accolades. Ubisoft supported Origins extensively following its launch, releasing two story expansions—The Hidden Ones and Curse of the Pharaohs—and a free Discovery Tour mode, which removes all combat from the game and allows players to learn about the history and culture of Ptolemaic Egypt through a series of guided tours. Its successor, Assassin's Creed Odyssey, which is set in Classical Greece during the Peloponnesian War, was released in October 2018.

Gameplay 

Assassin's Creed Origins is a Role-playing video game played from a third-person perspective. Players complete quests—linear scenarios with set objectives—to progress through the story, and can freely roam the open world environment on foot, horseback, camel-back, horse-drawn vehicles or boat. The open world includes all of Ancient Egypt, featuring vast deserts, oasis, lakes and ancient cities such as Alexandria and Memphis. The game's main character, Bayek, can dive underwater and explore the lakes and the rivers, the first instance of underwater exploration in the series since 2013's Black Flag. As the players explore the world, they encounter different non-playable characters who need assistance from Bayek. These side missions, which typically involve rescuing prisoners, defeating enemies, collecting items or investigating items of interest, often take Bayek to locations of interest, where the player can find treasures. Throughout the game, players can explore tombs and pyramids, raid bandit hideouts, solve riddle puzzles to find rare loot, and discover synchronization points, which then unlock additional locations of interest and serve as fast travel points. Other side activities players can undertake include competing in a gladiatorial arena where the player fights waves of increasingly difficult combinations of enemies culminating in a boss fight, participating in chariot racing, and solving stone circle puzzles.

Players earn experience points by performing acts like completing campaign missions and side missions, discovering new locations, and defeating enemies. As the players earn sufficient experience points, they can level up and earn skill points, which can unlock new abilities. The skill tree has three unique branches: Hunter, Warrior, and Seer. Hunter improves Bayek's ranged abilities; Warrior makes Bayek a more capable melee fighter; Seer turns Bayek into a more lethal and efficient assassin. Missions and areas have a level recommendation. Players need to reach a certain level before completing them, or else the game's enemies can  easily overpower them . To further enhance combat efficiency, Bayek's hidden blade, quiver, stabilizer glove, bracer, breastplate and tool pouch can be crafted using the resources collected from hunting wildlife, dismantling gear, and attacking convoys carrying supplies. Bayek needs to earn coins by looting and completing locations of interest. Coins can then be spent on purchasing or upgrading weapons, outfits and mounts. Gears and crafting materials can be purchased from a special vendor through loot boxes, though these boxes can only be purchased through the in-game currency. Despite this, some cosmetic items can only be purchased via Helix coins, which must be purchased with real-world currency.

Combat
Previous titles in the Assassin's Creed series used a "paired animation system" whereby the player character would engage with an enemy and combat would be dictated by a series of predetermined animations based on player inputs and scripted AI movements. Origins moved to a "hit-box system". When the player wields a weapon, they strike at whatever is in range, allowing them to hit and injure enemies directly, and creating the possibility of missing an enemy entirely. There are two modes of melee attack—light attacks are fast but weak, and heavy attacks are slow but strong. Complementing this is the way weapons fall into different categories (common, rare and legendary) and are rated on the damage dealt, speed and range. Bayek can be equipped with eight types of melee weapons and four types of bows and arrows. Legendary weapons can usually be obtained by defeating high-level enemies called the Phylakes. As enemy combat is also dictated by the hit-box system, the player is equipped with a shield and needs to balance their offensive and defensive capabilities. Players need to use different weapons when facing different enemy archetypes. They may also need to dodge or parry hostile attacks. Adrenaline slowly builds up during combat. When the player's adrenaline bar is full, they can unleash a devastating attack with their melee weapon. Bayek also has access to tools such as sleeping darts, poison darts, and firebombs, and can use the environment to his advantage. For instance, he can light enemies on fire after shooting oil canisters with fire arrows, and set traps near braziers, defeating enemies when they attempt to call for reinforcements.

Locations within the game world enable the player to choose their playing style by offering stealth and open combat as equally viable choices for completing objectives. Players can subdue enemies by sneaking up behind them using the hidden blade, though higher-level enemies are not easily defeated. The "eagle vision" mode, which was used by the franchise to give the player the ability to scout an area by highlighting enemies and objects, has been replaced by a Bonelli's eagle named Senu as a companion. The player can take control of Senu and scout an area in advance, highlighting enemies who will then be visible when they return to controlling Bayek. Players can hide in tall grass or navigate rooftops to avoid enemies' attention. Bayek, however, can whistle to draw an enemy toward him, allowing assassination when the player is still in hiding. As with other Assassin's Creed games, Bayek is an expert in free running and can climb nearly all structures. The player can also tame various predators, which will serve as a companion for the player and assist them against enemies. Naval combat returns in sections where players control Bayek's wife Aya, who can command a ship and attack hostile ship vessels.

Synopsis

Setting 
The player takes on the role of Layla Hassan, a researcher for Abstergo Industries, as she uses a modified Animus device to experience the genetic memories of Medjay Bayek of Siwa and his wife Aya, as they work to protect the people of Ptolemaic Egypt during a time of widespread upheaval. The Pharaoh, Ptolemy XIII, struggles to maintain his rule while harboring ambitions of expanding his kingdom. His sister, the recently deposed Cleopatra, begins marshaling loyalist forces to launch a counter-coup against Ptolemy. Additionally, incursions into the Kingdom by the Roman Republic under the command of Julius Caesar lead to fears of an imminent invasion. Bayek's role as a Medjay brings him and Aya into contact with the secretive forces manipulating these events and into forming the Hidden Ones, the precursor organization to the Assassin Brotherhood. In experiencing Bayek and Aya's memories, Layla may encounter a series of ancient structures built by the First Civilization. Each contains a message that alludes to Layla playing a pivotal role in an upcoming apocalyptic event.

Plot
Layla Hassan, a researcher for Abstergo Industries, is tasked with retrieving an artifact in Egypt on their behalf. Instead, she finds a tomb containing the mummified body of Bayek of Siwa, a former Egyptian Medjay who lived near the end of the Ptolemaic dynasty. Hoping to find information that would secure her a position in the company's Animus Project, Layla covertly uses a modified Animus device to relive Bayek's memories. She learns that Bayek embarked on an assassination campaign against five individuals who were responsible for the death of his son, and who attempt to gain control of the Pieces of Eden using a hidden vault under the local temple in Siwa and control the free will of humankind.

In 49 BCE, Bayek and his son Khemu are abducted by a group of masked men and taken to an underground vault in the local temple. The men give Bayek a dormant Piece of Eden and demand that he use it to open a secret vault. While struggling with one of the masked men, Bayek inadvertently kills Khemu. One year later, Bayek seeks vengeance and tracks down the five men to assassinate them. Bayek heads for Alexandria to see his wife Aya and tracks down the last of his targets, but he is disturbed by the last words of his final target, which imply that there are more of them. Layla realises that Aya would be buried in the same tomb as Bayek, and collects a DNA sample from her remains to read her memories simultaneously.

The couple turn to Aya's friend Apollodorus for more information, who escorts them to meet Cleopatra VII, who has been usurped by her brother and co-ruler Ptolemy XIII. She confirms that the masked men are members of the Order of Ancients, who were largely responsible for the coup and turning Ptolemy against her. Cleopatra gives Bayek four new targets, whom he tracks down and kills. Aya negotiates an alliance with the Roman general Pompey, who is fighting a civil war against his former triumvir Julius Caesar and planning on taking refuge in Egypt. Bayek begins to believe that Cleopatra is using him to kill her rivals. Having not reported back to the company since she began her mission, Abstergo kills Layla's medical assistant and sends personnel to kill Layla, but she manages to kill them off.

Bayek reports back to Cleopatra, who gives him two more targets who she believes are conspiring against her. The group head out to greet Pompey, but find that they were beaten by Ptolemy's general Lucius Septimius, who betrayed Pompey and cut off his head to present to Caesar. Hearing that Caesar is in Egypt, Cleopatra decides to negotiate an alliance with him instead. Bayek and Aya sneak Cleopatra into the palace to meet Caesar, who she impresses and secures his support. Caesar's support enables Cleopatra's forces to win the civil war against Ptolemy, who is killed while trying to flee across the Nile. Bayek kills Pothinus, Ptolemy's regent, but is prevented from killing Septimius by Caesar.

Cleopatra takes the throne as Pharaoh and cuts ties with Bayek and Aya, while Septimius becomes an advisor to Caesar. Bayek realizes that Cleopatra and Caesar have now aligned themselves with the Order, and gathers his allies to form a brotherhood to counter the Order and defend the people's free will. Bayek and Aya realize the Order showed interest in the tomb of Alexander the Great, where they find a mortally wounded Apollodorus. He says that Caesar's lieutenant Flavius is the leader of the Order and Khemu's murderer, and that the Order are heading for Siwa.

Returning to Siwa, Bayek finds that Flavius and Septimius have opened the vault, and are using the Pieces of Eden to control the people of Siwa. Hearing that Flavius went to Cyrene, Bayek tracks him down and kills him, thus avenging Khemu's death, and returns to Aya. Aya reveals that she plans to travel to Rome, where Septimius has headed, and has joined the conspiracy of Brutus and Cassius to assassinate Caesar. Coming to terms with reality, Bayek and Aya end their relationship, but form the Hidden Ones - the precursor of the Assassin Brotherhood - swearing to protect the world from the shadows.

Layla is awoken by William Miles, an Assassin Mentor and the father of the deceased Desmond Miles. He reveals that the Assassins have been observing her research and offers for her to work with them. She does not agree to join league with them, but agrees to go to Alexandria with Miles. In Rome, Aya confronts and kills Septimius, who wields the Staff of Eden. She infiltrates the Roman Senate and stabs Caesar, followed by several senators. Later, she meets Cleopatra and warns her to be a fair ruler, or she will return to assassinate her. Afterward, Bayek and Aya, now calling herself Amunet, begin recruiting and training other Hidden Ones as they build the Brotherhood in Egypt and Rome, respectively.

Development
Ubisoft Montreal led the game's development, with assistance provided by other Ubisoft studios in different parts of the world. The team in Montreal previously worked on Assassin's Creed Revelations and Assassin's Creed IV: Black Flag. Development began after Black Flags completion and lasted approximately four years. Ubisoft Sofia and Ubisoft Singapore played prominent roles in designing the game's map and quests. Sofia worked on the game's tomb and pyramids, while Singapore crafted the naval combat. Jean Guesdon and Ashraf Ismail, who both worked on Black Flag, returned as the game's directors. Nearly 1,000 people worked on the game; only 300 came from the Montreal studio. Ubisoft described this model of development as "co-development" where, unlike previous installments in the series, the support studios had more freedom and their work was more integral to the whole. According to Ismail, the co-development model allows each area in the game's world to be unique. Despite this, the Montreal studio set some guidelines that all studios needed to follow. For instance, the distance that a quest requires the players to travel is limited. For the quests in a hub area, there can only be one "funny" mission and one eradication mission. Ubisoft's goal was to modernize the series.

Ancient Egypt was one of the most popular choices requested by fans of the series, but Ubisoft had declined the idea. Alex Hutchinson, the creative director of Assassin's Creed III, called Ancient Egypt—along with the other two chosen settings, Feudal Japan and World War II—"the worst choices" for a setting. In a later interview, however, Ismail said Egypt was a setting the team wanted to explore and acknowledged fans' requests. He believed Ubisoft had not chosen Egypt for previous installments because of technological constraints. 49 BCE was chosen as the game's setting because it reflected an "impressive clash of civilizations". Egyptian culture was thriving but nearing its decline, while the Romans and the Greeks exerted a strong influence over Egypt, culminating in its annexation by the Roman Empire following the game's events. Ismail called this setting "epic" because it showed the "death of one world, [and] the birth of a new one". Initially, the team started with the world map from Black Flag and turned all its water bodies into landmasses. With such a large map, they needed to fill it with meaningful content, so they incorporated elements from role-playing video games and quests into the game. Puzzles, hunting, and military outposts were added to facilitate the player's exploration of the game's world. The game's combat was completely overhauled, as the developer wanted to give players more freedom of choice. For the first time, difficulty settings were introduced to the series to ensure the combat would be accessible.

The studio consulted Egyptologists and historians, and secured deals with universities to ensure that experts on the subject could provide the team with information and research. In addition to recruiting in-house historians, they also consulted academics like Jean-Claude Golvin to place landmarks in the game's world and recreate ancient paintings. The historians were involved in the game's creative process. For instance, Evelyne Ferron, one of the game's consultants, convinced Ubisoft to modify a scene featuring public mummification in a temple because the scene went against the "Egyptian mentality" at that time. Alan Gardiner's Egyptian Grammar: Being an Introduction to the Study of Hieroglyphs served as the foundation for the language spoken by the NPCs, though the team also drew from the works of James Allen and Raymond Faulkner. The goal was not to create a historically accurate version of Egypt but to make Egypt an authentic setting. The team watched films and TV series to see how ancient Egypt was portrayed in pop culture, and adjusted the game when they felt the focus on history had impeded gameplay and entertainment. Some cities featured in the game were larger than they were initially as the developer "wanted to create this sense of pharaonic scale in places like Alexandria and Memphis". Ismail added that if an event is well documented, the artists followed the historian's consensus. However, for parts that were not well-researched, they would design and recreate them on their own.

The team also endeavored to make the game world more immersive. To this end, the studio added sandstorms to the game, and players would experience a mirage if they remained in the heat too long. Cities have distinct designs which reflect their origins. While designing Alexandria, inspirations were taken from Pergamon, Turkey, whose design resembled that of ancient Alexandria. While most locations were handcrafted, artists and programmers made use of procedural generation to fill vast, open areas with rocks, grass and trees. Mini-map from the head-up display (HUD) were replaced with a compass, as they believed this made the HUD less obstructive and encouraged players to explore. To make the world more dynamic, the team invested a lot of time into designing the artificial intelligence of the non-playable characters, ensuring they would have a routine every day such as working during daytime and sleeping at night. Quest givers travel and do not stay in a fixed position, and players can choose the time of day to assassinate their targets. Factions also respond differently to players.

Alain Mercieca was invited to serve as the game's narrative director after a cinematic director saw one of his "punk plays" called Squeegee Nights. The lead character, Bayek, was more experienced and mature than other protagonists in the series. Ismail described Bayek as a "reactive" protagonist, who could express various emotions. Bayek, as a Medjay from Siwa Oasis, a traditional village in Egypt, embodies an older way of life and Egyptian traditions. As Egypt is about to be annexed by the Roman Empire in the game, Bayek must find out "what he needs to do, what he needs to become". His personal quest would lead ultimately to the formation of the Assassin Brotherhood. Abubakar Salim, who was initially told that he was auditioning for an animated TV series that required motion capture, voiced Bayek. In 2020, a report from Bloomberg alleged that Ubisoft, in particular the marketing department and Chief Creative Officer Serge Hascoët, had tried to minimize the role of female assassins in a number of Assassin's Creed games. Initially, Bayek was expected to be injured or killed off early in the game, and the main playable character would become Aya. Actress Alix Wilton Regan voiced Aya.

Release
Following the release of Assassin's Creed Syndicate (2015), which sold fewer copies than its predecessors, Ubisoft decided against releasing an Assassin's Creed game in 2016. Ubisoft allowed one year of additional development time so they could "evolve the game mechanics" and reposition the series as a "premier open-world franchise". Ubisoft CEO Yves Guillemot later added that this also gave the Montreal studio additional time to polish the game and learn from Assassin's Creed Unity (2014), whose troubled launch alienated the series' fans. Ubisoft had released new installments in the franchise every year since 2009's Assassin's Creed II. Assassin's Creed Origins was first leaked in January 2016, with Kotaku sources suggesting the game was codenamed Empire and set in ancient Egypt. Ubisoft announced it officially at Microsoft's press conference during E3 2017. The game was released for PlayStation 4, Windows, and Xbox One worldwide on October 27, 2017. There were five special editions of the game available when it launched. The Stadia version released on December 15, 2020.

Additional content 
Ubisoft supported the game extensively following its official launch. Several gear packs were released for the game, and Ubisoft partnered with Square Enix, the developers of Final Fantasy XV, to create crossover content. All season pass holders have access to two pieces of story-driven downloadable content (DLC) packs. The first pack, The Hidden Ones, was released on January 23, 2018, and is set five years after the game's main narrative, focusing on Bayek and Amunet's efforts to expand the Hidden Ones' influence and liberate the Sinai Peninsula from Roman occupation. The second pack, The Curse of the Pharaohs, was set to be released on March 6 but was delayed to March 13. This DLC focuses on Egyptian mythology, as Bayek travels to Thebes to investigate a curse that has apparently brought several ancient pharaohs back from the dead. Both packs raise the maximum players' level and introduce new outfits, mounts and gears.

Ubisoft also released several free updates for the game. In December 2017, they added a new mission named "Here Comes a New Challenger", introducing a new gladiatorial arena in Cyrene. The update also includes a new difficulty mode named Nightmare, and enemy scaling, where low-level enemies will have their level increased to match the player's level. Ubisoft also released a series of missions named Trials of the Gods, which allows players to fight high-level bosses inspired by Egyptian deities. A New Game Plus mode was introduced in February 2018. An update in April introduced the Animus Control Panel for PC players, allowing them to adjust gameplay parameters such as increasing the movement speed, possessing infinite health, and increasing the number of tame animals.

Ubisoft released Discovery Tour in February 2018. It consists of 75 guided tours, each lasting from five to 25 minutes. They focus on the landmarks featured in the game and the social traditions and the way of life of ancient Egyptians. The tours feature "academic information curated by historians and Egyptologists" based on research from universities and institutions like the British Museum. Discovery Tour removes combat from the game entirely, allowing teachers to show this portion of the game to schoolchildren directly. The team received feedback from people in the education field and designed the tour and its control to be as accessible as possible, and allow players to explore at their own pace. In an article on history-themed video games, Damals magazine wrote the Discovery Tour mode presented a transformation from an entertainment product to an interactive learning aid. In its 2018 exhibition on the "Queens of Egypt", the Pointe-à-Callière Museum in Montreal, Canada, incorporated images and video sequences from Discovery Tour. A standalone free version of Discovery Tour was released in May 2020. A similar Discovery Tour mode would later be released for Assassin's Creed Odyssey and Assassin's Creed Valhalla.

In June 2022, Ubisoft released a patch for Origins, which boosted the framerate to 60fps on Xbox Series X/S and PlayStation 5.

Reception

Critical reception

Assassin's Creed Origins received "generally favorable" reviews from critics, according to review aggregator Metacritic.

Louise Blain of GamesRadar praised the varied map design writing that each region felt unique. IGN's Alanah Pearce agreed, adding each city had its own unique culture and architecture. She added the game offered a "delightful sense of discovery" as it allowed players to come upon locations of interest organically. Chris Carter of Destructoid wrote that "at no point did Origins feel inauthentic", and applauded Egypt as a unique setting for a video game. Like Pearce, he explored the game's world more than previous Assassin's Creed games. VentureBeats Stephanie Chan described Egypt as "a spectacle to behold", praising its varied map design and the puzzles inside tombs and temples. Alessandro Fillari of GameSpot also liked Egypt as a setting, calling it "vibrant and lush". He believed it had a "strong sense of life", though he noted some regions are too sparse. He praised the dense towns and cities in the world, and commended Ubisoft's attention to detail. Writing for PC Gamer, Christopher Livingston noted the recommended level of an area made Origins similar to a massively multiplayer online game (MMO) and remarked it created "a feeling of artificial difficulty".

Blain praised the game's design and applauded the team for ditching the franchise's staple gameplay features such as paired animation combat, tailing missions, and an excessive amount of collectibles. Pearce liked the elimination of forced stealth missions and the implementation of a redesigned parkour system, which removed the frustration she had with earlier installments. She also applauded the new progression system, which gave players more choices than previous games, and the action-focused combat, which she described as "tense". Suriel Vasquez of Game Informer praised the game's openness, since it gave players freedom to approach objectives in their own way. He described the combat as being more active and involving. Chan described the combat as "flawed" but "generally solid", though she disliked segments featuring Aya and Layla as she felt they interrupted the gameplay. Christian Donlan, writing for Eurogamer, believed that the combat was a significant improvement over its predecessors and felt it reflected the franchise's new direction. He believed that the combat was more engaging, commenting it required players to use strategy, especially when they were facing different enemy archetypes together. However, he felt that the combat and the gameplay were unoriginal, and added that "everywhere you look in Origins you'll find things that you have done in other games". Both Pearce and Fillari complained the lock-on system did not work properly. Fillari added it turned "battles that could be tactical and fierce into disorienting and clumsy encounters". Fillari also noted that the control for stealth was less responsive than the previous games and considered it one of Origins weakest aspects.

Blain liked the game's quests noting that starting one side quest might initiate a chain of additional narrative side missions that players can complete. Pearce called the story "delightfully mystical" and "elaborate", while Fillari applauded the narrative for successfully balancing "moments of heartbreak and earnestness". Pearce also praised the side-quests for being memorable and featuring "multi-faceted, interesting characters with believable motives". While Carter noted that the game had a rough start, the tale involving the cult and the Order of the Ancients slowly became more intriguing and interesting. Chan criticised some campaign missions, especially those involving assassinating members of the cult, for being anticlimactic. She praised the side-quests for reflecting the everyday life of Egypt, but she lamented they were repetitive. She compared completing locations of interest to running errands. Andy Kelly, also from PC Gamer, added that the game was "guilty of a particularly egregious example of padding", and wrote that during his 28 hours play time to finish Origins, at least eight hours were spent on completing side content "against [his] will". Livingston remarked the player was often forced to grind for experience points before they could complete the main campaign missions, which broke the flow of the main campaign. Bayek is generally well-liked by critics. Donlan called him "charming", while Polygons Colin Campbell described him as "kind" and "devout".

Chris Naunton of Southampton University created Playing in the Past, a T.tv series, using Origins to teach the history of ancient Egypt. He and other Egyptologists described the game's depiction of the era as "the best visualization of Ancient Egypt ... amazing".

Sales
In November 2017, Ubisoft announced sales of Assassin's Creed Origins during its first 10 days were double those of Assassin's Creed Syndicate, while player engagement increased. 35% of the sales were digital download, compared to just 12% for Syndicate. It was the best-selling retail game in the UK in its first week of release, beating competitors including Super Mario Odyssey and Wolfenstein II: The New Colossus, which were released on the same day as Origins. It was the second best-selling retail game in the US in October 2017, behind Middle-earth: Shadow of War, and the third best-selling game in November, behind Call of Duty: WWII and Star Wars Battlefront II. The game sold more than 10 million copies during life of eighth generation of video game consoles.

Accolades

Sequel
The game was followed by Assassin's Creed Odyssey, which takes place in Ancient Greece during the Peloponnesian War. Developed by Ubisoft Quebec, the game was released on October 5, 2018 for PlayStation 4, Windows, and Xbox One.

References
Notes

References

External links 

 
 
 
 

2017 video games
Action role-playing video games
Ancient Egypt in fiction
Assassin's Creed
Cultural depictions of Cleopatra
Depictions of Julius Caesar in video games
Cultural depictions of Marcus Junius Brutus
Open-world video games
PlayStation 4 games
PlayStation 4 Pro enhanced games
Single-player video games
Stadia games
Stealth video games
Ubisoft games
Video games about revenge
Video games based on Egyptian mythology
Video games developed in Canada
Video games featuring female protagonists
Video game prequels
Video games scored by Sarah Schachner
Video games set in ancient Rome
Video games set in antiquity
Video games set in Egypt
Video games set in Libya
Video games set in the 1st century BC
Video games set in 2017
Video games using Havok
Video games with downloadable content
Video games with expansion packs
Windows games
Xbox One games
Xbox One X enhanced games